Sydenham Moore (May 25, 1817 – August 20, 1862) was a U.S. Representative from Alabama.

Early life
Born in Rutherford County, Tennessee, Moore pursued classical studies.
He attended the University of Alabama at Tuscaloosa 1833-1836.
He studied law.
He was admitted to the bar and commenced practice in Greensboro, Alabama. He owned slaves.
He served as judge of Greene County court 1840-1846 and 1848-1850.
He served as judge of the circuit court in 1857.
He served in the war with Mexico as captain in Colonel Coffey's regiment of Alabama Infantry from June 1846 to June 1847.
Moore was elected brigadier general of Alabama Militia.

Congress
Moore was elected as a Democrat to the Thirty-fifth and Thirty-sixth Congresses and served from March 4, 1857, until January 21, 1861, when he withdrew.

Civil War
During the Civil War served as colonel of the 11th Regiment Alabama Infantry in the Confederate States Army.
He died in Richmond, Virginia, from wounds received in the Battle of Seven Pines, May 31, 1862.
He was interred in the City Cemetery, Greensboro, Alabama.  Moore's journal and other personal papers remain in Montgomery, Alabama, at the Alabama Department of Archives and History.

References

External links
 Letter from Sydenham Moore in Virginia, to his wife, Amanda May 9, 1862.

Notes

1817 births
1862 deaths
People from Rutherford County, Tennessee
Democratic Party members of the United States House of Representatives from Alabama
Alabama state court judges
American slave owners
19th-century American politicians
19th-century American judges
Confederate States Army officers
Confederate militia generals
United States politicians killed during the Civil War
Confederate States of America military personnel killed in the American Civil War